Fidélitas University is a private university in Lourdes, Montes de Oca, San José, Costa Rica. Fidélitas is one of the best high educational quality universities in Costa Rica. Fidelitas offers fifteen careers in various fields such as engineering, education, business, law and psychology. Its mission is to provide vocational training at the highest level, with a human face and to promote personal and academic excellence in a helpful atmosphere.

Scholarships
Fidélitas University has a scholarship program, aimed at providing fifth year students who have continued their studies a grant and incentive to further their studies.

Fidélitas also participates in a program called "Stay in Class" to cooperate against student dropout in Costa Rica.

References
Universidad Fidelitas Pagina Principal

Universities in Costa Rica